China – Luxembourg relations officially established in 1949 and began on November 16, 1972.

History 
Luxembourg established official diplomatic relations with the Nanking government of the Republic of China in 1949. After losing the Chinese Civil War, relations continued in the island of Taiwan and Luxembourg continued to recognize the ROC government as a recognized representative of China as is other Western nations. Both countries fought in the same side during the Korean War in the 1950s.

In November 1972, the government of Luxembourg switched recognition from the ROC to the PRC. Mutual visits commenced in the 1980s with the Grand Duchy of Luxembourg visiting China and the high-ranking officials of the State Council of the People's Republic of China visited Luxembourg.

In 1989, Luxembourg followed the European Union and imposed sanctions on China. Relations gradually improved from 1991 onwards.

Economic relations 

The trade value between the two countries stood at S$101 million in 2002.

Luxembourg exported steel material, mechanic and electric products to China. Chinese exports to Luxembourg comprise textile, garments, plastic products and toys.

Sino-Luxembourg trade relations have also focused on reducing trade barriers to investments. In March 2019, Luxembourg signed an agreement with China to cooperate on its Belt and Road Initiative, making it one of only a few Western European nations to do so.

Human rights criticisms
Hong Kong national security law
In June 2020, Luxembourg openly opposed the Hong Kong national security law

See also 
Foreign relations of China
Foreign relations of Luxembourg

References

External links 
Luxembourg Embassy, China 
Embassy of China in the Luxembourg 

 
Luxembourg
Bilateral relations of Luxembourg